The 1945 Albanian National Championship was the eighth season of the Albanian National Championship, the top professional league for association football clubs, since its establishment in 1930.

Overview
It was contested by 12 teams, and Vllaznia won the championship.

Regular season

Group A

Group B

Note: 'Ismail Qemali' is Flamurtari, 'Bashkimi Elbasanas' is KS Elbasani and 'Shqiponja' is Luftëtari. 'Ylli' and 'Liria' were short-lived military teams.

Finals

References
Albania - List of final tables (RSSSF)

Kategoria Superiore seasons
1
Albania
Albania